SpectraVision may refer to:
 Spectravideo, 1981–1988 computer and video game company also known as SpectraVision
 SpectraVision, brand name for On Command Corporation's hotel television service
 SpectraVision, implementation of the Pepper's ghost optical illusion

See also
 SelectaVision